Women's Legal Centre Trust v President of the Republic of South Africa, an important case in South African law, was heard in the Constitutional Court on May 20, 2009, with judgment handed down on July 22, 2009.

Facts 
The court had to determine whether Parliament and the President had failed in their exclusive constitutional obligation to enact legislation governing Muslim marriages.

Judgment 
The court found that the obligation in fact did not fall exclusively on Parliament and the President, and that, in terms of the Constitution, the court did not have exclusive jurisdiction to entertain the application.

The question, therefore, of whether or not Parliament and the President are under an obligation (even if not exclusive) to recognise Muslim marriage, and whether or not such legislation would be consistent with the Constitution, went unanswered.

June 2022 
A second case with this title was heard on 5 August 2021 and decided on 28 June 2022.

See also 
 Daniels v Campbell
 South African family law

References

Cases 
 Women's Legal Centre Trust v President of the Republic of South Africa 2009 (6) SA 94 (CC).

Notes 

Constitutional Court of South Africa cases
2009 in South African law
2009 in case law
South African family case law